Dzikowo may refer to several places:
Dzikowo, Kuyavian-Pomeranian Voivodeship (north-central Poland)
Dzikowo, Gorzów County in Lubusz Voivodeship (west Poland)
Dzikowo, Wałcz County in West Pomeranian Voivodeship (north-west Poland)
Dzikowo, Krosno Odrzańskie County in Lubusz Voivodeship (west Poland)
Dzikowo, Koszalin County in West Pomeranian Voivodeship (north-west Poland)
Dzikowo, Myślibórz County in West Pomeranian Voivodeship (north-west Poland)